Charles Speight  (30 July 1865 – 19 February 1928) was a notable New Zealand brewer and businessman. 

Speight was born in Dunedin, New Zealand, in 1865. In the 1926 King's Birthday Honours Speight was appointed a Commander of the Order of the British Empire in recognition of his role as vice-chairman of the New Zealand and South Seas International Exhibition.

See also
 Speight's

References

1865 births
1928 deaths
Businesspeople from Dunedin
New Zealand Commanders of the Order of the British Empire